Garbage is an American rock band formed in 1993 in Madison, Wisconsin. The band's line-up—consisting of Scottish singer Shirley Manson (vocals) and American musicians Duke Erikson (guitar, bass, keyboards), Steve Marker (guitar, keyboards), and Butch Vig (drums, production)—has remained unchanged since its inception. All four members are involved in the songwriting and production process. Garbage has sold over 17 million albums worldwide.

The band's eponymous debut album was critically acclaimed upon its release, selling over four million copies and achieving double platinum certification in the United Kingdom, United States and in Australia. It was accompanied by a string of increasingly successful singles from 1995 to 1996, including "Stupid Girl" and "Only Happy When It Rains". Follow-up Version 2.0, released in 1998 after a year in production, was equally successful, topping the UK Albums Chart and receiving two Grammy Award nominations. Garbage followed this by performing and co-producing the theme song to the nineteenth James Bond film The World Is Not Enough (1999).

Garbage's third album Beautiful Garbage was also critically acclaimed, but failed to match the commercial success of its predecessors. Garbage quietly disbanded amidst the troubled production of their fourth album Bleed Like Me, but regrouped to complete the album, which was released in 2005 and peaked at a career-high number four in the U.S. The band cut short their Bleed Like Me concert tour and announced an indefinite hiatus, emphasizing that they had not broken up but rather wished to pursue separate interests. The hiatus was briefly interrupted in 2007, when the band recorded new tracks for their greatest hits album Absolute Garbage. The band reunited in 2011, and self-released their 2012 album Not Your Kind of People on their own label Stunvolume to positive reviews. Their next album, Strange Little Birds, followed in 2016. Their seventh studio album, No Gods No Masters, was released in 2021.

History

Formation and early years (1993–1994) 

Duke Erikson and Butch Vig had been in several bands, including Spooner and Fire Town (with Steve Marker as a sound engineer). In 1983, Vig and Marker founded Smart Studios in Madison and Vig's production work brought him to the attention of Sub Pop. Spooner reunited in 1990 and released another record, but disbanded in 1993 as Vig and Marker's career as producers gained strength. In 1994, as Vig become "kind of burned out on doing really long records," he got together with Erikson and Marker, and they started doing remixes for acts such as U2, Depeche Mode, Nine Inch Nails, and House of Pain. The remixes featured different instrumentation, and often highlighting new guitar hooks and bass grooves. This experience inspired the three men to form a band, where they "wanted to take that remix sensibility and somehow translate it into all of the possibilities of a band setup."

According to Vig, the team drew inspiration for its name from a hostile early comment, when a friend of the band heard recording material, probably for "Vow" and groaned, "This shit sounds like garbage!"  However, according to This Is The Noise That Keeps Me Awake, an autobiography of the band, Vig wrote in his 1993 studio journal about the creative process; of working for long periods of time, "without coming up with anything cool... and when you least expect it, it all falls into place." The name derives from the last line of this entry: "I hope that all this garbage will become something beautiful!".

Initial sessions with Vig on vocals, along with the members' past work with all-male groups, led to the band's desire for a woman on lead. Vig declared that they wanted to find a female vocalist like "Debbie Harry, Patti Smith, Chrissie Hynde and Siouxsie Sioux – all really strong, unique personalities". Marker and Vig desired someone "who didn't have a high, chirpy, girly quality to her voice" and who could sing in an understated way, in contrast to "these alterna-rock singers [that] have a tendency to scream".  Marker was watching 120 Minutes when he saw the music video for Angelfish's "Suffocate Me". He showed the video to Erikson and Vig while their manager Shannon O'Shea tracked down the band's singer, Shirley Manson. When Manson was contacted, she did not know who Vig was and was urged to check the credits on Nevermind, the Nirvana album which Vig had produced.

On April 8, 1994, Manson met Erikson, Marker, and Vig for the first time in London. Later that evening Vig was informed of Nirvana frontman Kurt Cobain's suicide. Garbage was put on hold until Angelfish was finished touring North America in support of Live. Erikson, Marker, and Vig attended the Metro Chicago date, and Manson was invited to Madison to audition for the band. The audition did not go well, but Manson socialized with the men while there and they found they had a similar taste in music. Angelfish disbanded at the end of the Live tour. Manson called O'Shea and asked to audition again, feeling that "it could work out".

Manson described her first session with the band as "a disaster", as she had no experience as a session player, and she and the band were "two parties totally uncomfortable with the situation", but the "mutual disdain" from that meeting managed to pull the band together. The first songs were skeletal versions of the songs "Stupid Girl", "Queer" and "Vow", which led to some ad-libbed lyrics by Manson. Manson had never written a song prior to this session; nevertheless, this time she was invited to join the band. Lyrics were penned at a cabin in the north woods of Wisconsin while the songs were recorded at Smart Studios. Conscious of the grunge genre that had made their names, particularly Vig's, the band made every effort to avoid sounding similar, deliberately striving to make a pop record.

Garbage sent out demo tapes with no bio, to avoid a bidding war over Vig's production history. Garbage signed with Mushroom UK worldwide (excluding North America) and secured the band a Volume magazine compilation inclusion. The only potential candidate for release was "Vow", as it was the only song for which the band had completed production. When released in December, "Vow" began to receive radio airplay on XFM and from Radio 1 DJs Steve Lamacq, John Peel, and Johnnie Walker. Word-of-mouth on "Vow" took the track back to the US. On December 21, Garbage signed to Jerry Moss's label Almo Sounds for North America. Manson was licensed to both Mushroom and Almo by Radioactive Records for a single album, with no compensation from any of Garbage's labels.

Garbage had not considered "Vow" for inclusion on the album or even as a single. Because the exclusive licensing of Volume prevented a full commercial single release, on March 20, 1995, Mushroom issued "Vow" in a limited 7-inch vinyl format through Discordant, a label set up just to launch Garbage. By May, commercial alternative radio in the US had picked up on the track, and it began to receive heavy rotation nationwide. "Vow" debuted on Hot Modern Rock Tracks at No. 39. It climbed gradually over the following weeks, peaking at No. 26 in July. "Vow" bubbled under for two weeks before it spent two weeks on the Billboard Hot 100 staying at No. 97 both weeks.

Garbage (1995–1997) 

On August 15, 1995, Garbage debuted on the Billboard 200 at No. 193. In the United Kingdom, its release was preceded by non-album track "Subhuman" and "Only Happy When It Rains" as singles to promote the album instead of "Queer". The album debuted on the UK album chart at No. 12. In Australia, the album debuted at No. 5. "Queer" was quickly released in the United Kingdom and Europe, while Garbage began their first tour. Garbage was nominated for Brit Awards for Best New Band and Best International Newcomer.

Garbage toured for the self-titled Garbage throughout 1996. "Only Happy When It Rains" was released as a single in North America; "Stupid Girl" was released to promote European dates. MTV announced that "Only Happy When It Rains" was certified a "Buzz clip", guaranteeing heavy rotation on its network from February 13. "Only Happy" peaked at No. 55 on the Hot 100. "Stupid Girl" received frequent video and radio airplay in the UK and peaked at No. 4, becoming the band's first top 10 hit on the UK Singles Chart and elevated the album to No. 6.

In May, Garbage reworked "Milk" with Tricky in a Chicago recording studio before supporting Smashing Pumpkins on their arena tour until the overdose of Pumpkins keyboardist Jonathan Melvoin. "Stupid Girl" peaked at No. 24 on the Hot 100. Its Top 40 radio remix by Todd Terry received massive airplay.

Garbage Video, a compilation of the album's promotional videos, was released in November 1996. Garbage was nominated for the Grammy Award for Best New Artist, while "Stupid Girl" received two nominations for Best Rock Song and Best Rock Performance By A Duo Or Group.

Worldwide, the final single release from the album was the reworked version of "Milk", which became the band's second UK top 10 hit. The band performed the song live at the MTV Europe Music Awards in London on November 14; Garbage won the Breakthrough award at the event. In North America, Almo Sounds released album track "Supervixen" to Modern Rock radio, while Mushroom Records released a remix of "#1 Crush" in March 1997 as a single from the soundtrack to Romeo + Juliet, which topped the Modern Rock Tracks chart for four weeks from the start of the year; the remix was also featured as the theme for the TV show Hex. "#1 Crush" was later nominated for Best Song From a Movie at the 1997 MTV Movie Awards.

Version 2.0 (1997–2000) 

Garbage relocated to Friday Harbor, Washington on March 1, 1997 to write songs for their second album. Returning to Smart Studios a short while later, the band found themselves under intense pressure to repeat the success of Garbage. The band decided not to change their formula, but progress musically by pushing their sound as far as it could go—hence the album's eventual title Version 2.0, which was completed by February 15, 1998. In March, the first single "Push It" became the No. 1 most added record at the UK Alternative Radio. It became their third consecutive UK top ten hit at No. 9.

In May 1998, Version 2.0 debuted at No. 1 in the UK and at No. 13 in the Billboard 200. Garbage began touring Version 2.0 that month, a tour which lasted until the end of 1999. "I Think I'm Paranoid" was released worldwide in July, while the music video for "Push It" received eight nominations at the 1998 MTV Video Music Awards. By October 12, "Special" was released and Garbage was nominated for three MTV Europe Music Awards: "Best Group", "Best Rock Act" and "Best Video" for "Push It".

In early 1999, Version 2.0 received two Grammy Award nominations for Album of the Year and Best Rock Album "Special" was No. 1 most added single at the Top 40 radio. In Europe, Garbage began their biggest headline tour, releasing singles for "When I Grow Up" and "The Trick Is to Keep Breathing". In April, "When I Grow Up" was released to Modern Rock radio. "When I Grow Up" was then featured on the movie Big Daddy. Version 2.0 was awarded the European Platinum Award by the International Federation of the Phonographic Industry for one million sales across Europe and the United States. "You Look So Fine" was released as the final single from Version 2.0 worldwide, as Garbage toured Europe, including headlining in Edinburgh to mark the opening of the Scottish Parliament.

On August 4, Garbage was contracted to perform the theme for the James Bond film The World Is Not Enough and worked with composer David Arnold in London and Vancouver. Garbage co-headlined an Australian tour with Alanis Morissette, while "When I Grow Up" spent three months in the Australian chart, becoming the band's most successful single there. "The World Is Not Enough" reached the top 10s in Italy, Latvia, Lithuania, Norway and Finland, as well as the top 40 in Germany, Austria, Switzerland and the United Kingdom. "Special" received Grammy nominations for Best Rock Song and for Best Rock Performance by a Duo or Group, while "When I Grow Up" was re-issued in Europe.

Beautiful Garbage (2001–2002) 

Garbage regrouped on April 10, 2001. The group began work on their third record, and put aside plans for a B-sides album due to the sale of Almo Sounds to the UMG. Manson ran an online blog throughout the recording of the album named Beautiful Garbage. During the recording of the album, Garbage invoked a provision of its contract to leave Almo, and sued UMG when it refused to terminate the contract. UMG threatened to use Manson's 1993 solo contract to tie Garbage to the label. The suit was settled on July 29, 2001, and Garbage moved to Interscope. Lead single "Androgyny" was released to radio by the end of August, and its video was released on September 10. The following day, due to the September 11 attacks in New York City and Washington D.C., the promotion schedule for the album was put on hold.

Released three weeks after the September 11 attacks, the album suffered from lack of promotion, mixed reaction from critics and fans alike, and the failure of its lead single "Androgyny" to achieve high chart positions. Despite faltering in major markets, Beautiful Garbage debuted at number one on Billboard Top Electronic Albums chart where it stayed for eight weeks, topped the album charts in Australia, and was named one of Rolling Stone'''s "Top 10 Albums of the Year".

In October, Beautiful Garbage achieved a No. 13 debut on the Billboard 200, reached number six on the Top Internet Albums chart, and topped the Electronic Albums chart for seven weeks. In its first three months on sale, Beautiful Garbage sold 1.2 million copies.

Garbage supported U2 on the third leg of their Elevation Tour. After the last show, Vig contracted Hepatitis A and was replaced by Matt Chamberlain for European dates. In December "Breaking Up the Girl" was released as a single. On December 27, Rolling Stones United States and Australian editions named Beautiful Garbage as one of their critics "Top 10 Albums of the Year".

"Cherry Lips" was released at the end of 2001, becoming a massive hit in Australia, peaking at number seven on the ARIA Charts, and number eleven in the highly influential Triple J Hottest 100, 2001. Sony Music Japan released an exclusive E.P. of rare tracks titled Special Collection.

 Bleed Like Me and hiatus (2003–2005) 

Garbage started proper work on their fourth record in March 2003, writing "Right Between the Eyes" in 30 minutes. It was a false start. Recording was halted during the summer when Manson underwent surgery on her right vocal cord and was not given the okay to sing again until August. By October, due to rising tension within the band and a breakdown in communication, Vig relocated to Los Angeles while Manson returned to Scotland. During the Christmas period, Vig decided to give the band another chance, having met excited fans eager to hear how the album was going.

In January 2004 Garbage reconvened in Los Angeles with Dust Brothers' John King, drummer Matt Chamberlain, bassist Justin Meldal-Johnsen, and on February 6, Dave Grohl performed drums on "Bad Boyfriend". His performance was regarded by the band as "raising the bar" for the record. Following the John King sessions, the band formally relocated to Los Angeles and wrote "Metal Heart" and "Boys Wanna Fight", both more energetic than they had been writing and lyrically more "overtly political"; both songs referenced the United States and the United Kingdom-led 2003 invasion of Iraq.

In 2005, lead single "Why Do You Love Me" debuted on the Modern Rock Tracks chart at No. 39. as well as No. 97 and No. 81 on the Billboard Hot 100 and Pop 100 charts respectively, becoming the band's most successful single for six years. Bleed Like Me entered Top 10 in the US.

On August 25, 2005 Garbage cancelled their scheduled October tour dates in France, Belgium and the United Kingdom. They released a statement that the band had "somewhat overextended themselves" and decided to conclude their tour in Australia on October 1. Ahead of the Australian tour, "Sex Is Not The Enemy" was released to Australian radio. The end of the tour marked the end of active promotion for Bleed Like Me. The band confirmed that they were going "on indefinite hiatus" to dispel reports of a split. "We were barely even speaking," Manson later admitted. "We didn't want to talk to anyone outside of the band about the problems we were having with our career, so of course it turned into this whole passive-aggressive thing between us. I just wanted to get the fuck out of there and go home."

Reunion and Absolute Garbage (2007)
Garbage ended their 18-month hiatus on January 31, 2007, at a benefit show in Glendale, California, organised by Vig to help pay musician Wally Ingram's medical care following treatment for throat cancer. Prior to this, Garbage had been sharing song ideas via the internet and were keen on getting into the recording studio to complete them. Garbage began work on the new songs in earnest during February and March at Vig's home studio, completing four tracks including "Tell Me Where It Hurts", which was released as the album's lead single.

Absolute Garbage was released in July, remastered and including a special edition bonus remix package. A DVD format rounded out the package; among the fifteen Garbage music videos included was a documentary film titled "Thanks For Your, Uhhh Support" featuring backstage and behind-the-scenes footage, live performances and interviews. A Garbage track called "Witness to Your Love" was released on a charity, "limited availability," compilation in the US. The release was available from Urban Outfitters from Wednesday, October 15, 2008, to Thursday, January 31, 2009, and went on radio in the US on October 17.

Not Your Kind of People (2010–2012)

On February 1, 2010, it was confirmed through Shirley Manson's official Facebook profile that she spent a week in the studio with her bandmates. In the post, Manson wrote "Guess who I just spent a week in the studio with? Would you be pleased if I said one of them was called Steve and one of them was called Duke and another was a Grammy-winning producer?" In October 2010, it was officially confirmed that Garbage were recording their fifth studio album. In an interview with Jason Tanamor, Duke stated in regard to the band reuniting after seven years, "It’s kind of amazing we all happen to be in the right place at the same time. I don’t know. The stars were aligned or something. It was quite coincidental we were all on the same page and ready to give it another go."

On September 17, 2011, the band clarified that their forthcoming 11-track LP would be mixed by October 17, while another 12 songs would be finalized by the end of the year and see release as "b-sides, extra tracks and maybe one might even come your way simply as a Christmas present from Garbage as a thank you to you all for sticking around," though this did not materialize.

The band announced to Billboard that their fifth studio album would be released independently of any major label support. On January 6, 2012, the band announced that they had entered Red Razor Studios in Glendale, California to record bonus material for their forthcoming album, later confirming on Twitter that a further five tracks were being worked on, including the new title "What Girls Are Made Of." Not Your Kind of People was released on May 14, 2012, to generally positive reviews. The album reached number 13 on the Billboard 200, and number 10 on the UK Albums Chart. The band supported the album with the year-long Not Your Kind of People World Tour. The song Not Your Kind of People was used in a trailer for the video game, Metal Gear Solid V: The Phantom Pain.

 Record Store Day releases (2013–2015) 
Garbage and Screaming Females recorded a cover of "Because the Night" for Record Store Day 2013. They released a video directed by Sophie Muller. The band released their first live DVD, One Mile High... Live, in May 2013. Shirley Manson confirmed that they would release two new songs for Record Store Day on April 19, 2014. "Girls Talk", an out-take from the Absolute Garbage sessions, was re-recorded to include vocals from Brody Dalle, and was backed by an out-take from the Not Your Kind of People sessions, "Time Will Destroy Everything".

In 2014, Manson confirmed that the band is working on a book, and noted that the next record would be her "romance novel". On January 23, 2015, Garbage confirmed on their Facebook page that they completed two new songs for Record Store Day 2015; "The Chemicals", which features vocals from Brian Aubert of Silversun Pickups, was released on April 18, 2015. The band played the Pa’l Norte Rock Festival in Monterrey, Mexico, on April 25, 2015.

On October 2, 2015, the band released the Deluxe Edition of their debut album, in commemoration of the 20th anniversary of the album. The album was remastered from the original tapes, and all b-sides (called G-sides on the album), were included. During the 20 Years Queer tour, Vig announced that mixing of the new album would be finished by February 1, 2016, and that it would be promoted by a world tour beginning in the summer.

 Strange Little Birds (2016–2018) 

On February 6, 2016 Garbage stated on their Facebook page that mixing was almost done: "Our new record is an inch away, just an inch away from being done. And I do mean an inch away from being completely done. Recorded. Mixed. And soon to be mastered." Vig also confirmed the title of a new song, "Even Though Our Love is Doomed". Three days later, Garbage announced that they had completed the album. Strange Little Birds, the band's sixth studio album, was released on June 10, 2016.

Writing and recording for Strange Little Birds took over two years, starting in early 2013. Garbage recorded over twenty tracks during the sessions. The band recorded the album in Vig's basement and at engineer Billy Bush's Red Razor Sounds studio in Los Angeles. Vig stated, "we mixed it so it’s kind of confessional, almost confrontational. On a lot of songs, Shirley’s voice sounds really loud, in your face, and really dry. There are not a lot of effects. There are some moments on the record that get really huge, but a lot of it is really intimate." Two of the songs written during the sessions, "The Chemicals" and "On Fire", were given a vinyl release on Record Store Day the previous year.

 Version 2.0: 20th Anniversary (2018–2019) 
 
The band announced that in May 2018 the band would release a 20th anniversary edition of their second album Version 2.0 in a similar fashion to the 20th anniversary edition of their self-titled debut album. The anniversary edition would also see Garbage commit to touring for this celebration which took place towards the end of 2018. As of March 2018, Garbage had also been working on a new studio album which, according to Shirley Manson, was due for a 2020 release.

No Gods No Masters and Beautiful Garbage: 20th Anniversary (2021–2022)
In 2017, Garbage recorded and released a standalone digital single titled "No Horses", which the band hinted could be the direction their new material would sound. Writing for Garbage's seventh album began in April 2018, following some preliminary work at Butch Vig's home studio, the band set up space in Palm Springs to write demos. The quartet sketched out the skeleton of the album over two weeks, jamming, experimenting and feeling the songs out. Work was paused in the latter half of 2018, as Garbage marked the twentieth anniversary of their second album Version 2.0 (1998) with the two-month 20 Years Paranoid tour, before reconvening in Los Angeles to finish the project.

On March 30, 2021, Garbage released the song "The Men Who Rule the World", the lead single from their seventh studio album, No Gods No Masters, which was released on June 11, 2021. On April 28, the album's title track "No Gods No Masters" was released as the second single, followed by "Wolves" on May 19. No Gods No Masters was supported in summer 2021 with an arena concert tour with Garbage as guests of Alanis Morissette. The tour went on to become the most successful female-fronted tour of the year, selling more than 500,000 tickets.

In August 2021, Garbage announced that they would release a 20th anniversary edition of their third studio album, Beautiful Garbage, which was originally released in 2001. This follows previous reissued anniversary editions of Garbage (1995, reissued in 2015) and Version 2.0 (1998, reissued in 2018). The reissue features a previously unheard version of the album's lead single "Androgyny", with Manson explaining, "We wanted to celebrate the release of our third album in the same manner as we have celebrated the 20th anniversaries of our previous two records, as we cherish this third child of ours just as much as its predecessors". The reissued version of Beautiful Garbage was released on November 5, 2021.

On October 20, a 10-date UK Tour by Blondie featuring Garbage as special guest was announced for November. However, the tour was later postponed to spring 2022, featuring Johnny Marr instead of Garbage as special guest due to scheduling conflicts. In May 2022, Garbage joined Tears for Fears for the 21-date United States wing of The Tipping Point World Tour as special guest. In summer, Garbage toured the United States and Canada with Alanis Morissette for 10 dates of her Jagged Little Pill 25th anniversary tour. On April 14, Garbage announced a 7-date United States headline tour at the end of June supported by Glass Battles. However, the last four dates of the tour were cancelled due to illness in the band.

 Anthology and eighth studio album (2022–present) 
 
On September 7, 2022, Garbage announced their third greatest hits album Anthology, released on October 28. The compilation features 35 newly remastered tracks celebrating three decades of career, including "Witness To Your Love", which was released as single.

On October 4, Garbage performed "The World Is Not Enough" at the Royal Albert Hall in London with the Royal Philharmonic Orchestra as part of The Sound of 007: Live at the Royal Albert Hall curated by David Arnold, marking the 60th anniversary of the Bond franchise. The event was made available for streaming on Prime Video on October 5. A documentary by Matt Whitecross titled The Sound of 007 featuring an interview with Garbage premiered on Prime Video the same day. Prior to the event, the 2022 remaster of "The World Is Not Enough" was released as digital single. On October 22, Garbage performed at Audacy's 9th annual We Can Survive at the Hollywood Bowl in Los Angeles.

Early in 2022, Garbage started writing for their upcoming eighth studio album. In October, after fulfilling their touring obligations, Garbage resumed writing for the album. In February 2023, Garbage announced their Summer 2023 co-headline North American tour with Noel Gallagher's High Flying Birds featuring Metric as special guests. On April 22, 2023 Garbage will release the four-song 12" Witness to Your Love EP as a vinyl exclusive Record Store Day release featuring "Witness to Your Love" backed by an unreleased cover of "Cities in Dust", originally by Siouxsie and the Banshees, and two outtakes from the No Gods No Masters sessions, "Blue Betty" and "Adam and Eve".

Musical style

Garbage's musical style has been described as alternative rock, electronic rock, electropop, trip hop, post-grunge,  industrial rock, dance-rock, and hard rock. Garbage's intention is to make pop-like songs which mix a variety of genres, with Steve Marker saying that the band wanted to "take pop music and make it as horrible sounding as we can." These genres include trip hop, grunge, 1980s rock music, techno, power pop, and shoegaze. Shirley Manson has stated that the band itself "used to describe [their sound] as sci-fi pop, because we felt it was taking a futuristic approach." Vig has said the crossover-heavy sound was inspired by the band's background with remixes, where songs would be rearranged to every musical style to which they held interest, and also that he "grew up listening to everything from pop radio and opera to country music and polka, so I really thought that Garbage would be an interesting and eclectic thing to do." 
Lindsay Zoladz of Pitchfork notes Garbage prevailed in the glory days of alternative-rock "probably because their sound was a hectic amalgamation of almost everything that mingled on the format's airwaves: electronica, punk, industrial rock, grunge, and the occasional trip-hop". Likewise, Vice wrote that from their singular concoctions of styles like trip hop, grunge, rock, techno, and shoegaze, Garbage "has forged a kind of queasy originality" in the search of "a kind of perverse beauty".

Garbage has been inspired by The Velvet Underground, Iggy & The Stooges, T. Rex, Roxy Music, The Pretenders, Siouxsie and the Banshees, Blondie, Cocteau Twins, Patti Smith, The Smashing Pumpkins and David Bowie.

Members
 Shirley Manson – vocals, guitar, keyboards
 Duke Erikson – guitar, bass, keyboards, backing vocals
 Steve Marker – guitar, bass, keyboards, backing vocals
 Butch Vig – drums, percussion, keyboards, backing vocals

Touring members
 Eric Avery – bass, guitar, keyboards (2005–2022)
 Daniel Shulman – bass (1995–2005, 2022–present)
 Matthew Walker – drums (2002, 2017, 2019) – freelance for Vig
 Matt Chamberlain – drums (2002) – freelance for Vig

Awards and nominations

Garbage have received fifty-seven nominations, winning fifteen awards. Major awards which Garbage have been nominated for include the Grammy Awards and the BRIT Awards.

Concert toursHeadlining tours Garbage tour (1995–1996)
 Version 2.0 tour (1998–1999)
 Beautiful Garbage tour (2001–2002)
 Bleed Like Me tour (2005)
 Not Your Kind of People tour (2012–2013)
 20 Years Queer tour (2015)
 Strange Little Birds tour (2016)
 Rage and Rapture tour (with Blondie) (2017)
 20 Years Paranoid (2018)
 Destroying Angels (2019)Supporting tours 2020 World Tour: Celebrating 25 Years of Jagged Little Pill - tour supporting Alanis Morissette (post-poned to 2021)
 2022 The Tipping Point World tour supporting Tears for Fears
 2022 North American Tour: Celebrating 25 Years of Jagged Little Pill - tour supporting Alanis Morissette

DiscographyStudio albums' Garbage (1995)
 Version 2.0 (1998)
 Beautiful Garbage (2001)
 Bleed Like Me (2005)
 Not Your Kind of People (2012)
 Strange Little Birds (2016)
 No Gods No Masters'' (2021)

References

Sources

External links

 
 
 

 
Almo Sounds artists
Alternative rock groups from Wisconsin
American electronic rock musical groups
American industrial rock musical groups
American post-grunge musical groups
Electronic music groups from Wisconsin
Female-fronted musical groups
MTV Europe Music Award winners
Musical groups established in 1993
Musical groups reestablished in 2010
Musical quartets
Trip hop groups
1993 establishments in Wisconsin